"Shorley Wall" is a song by Ooberman, released as the fourth and final single from their debut album The Magic Treehouse. It was released by Independiente in March 2000, and was the band's last release for the label. "Shorley Wall" was originally the lead track of an EP released by the band in 1998.  The song charted at #47 on the UK Singles Chart.

Track listing

CD1 (ISOM41MS)
 "Shorley Wall" (Popplewell/Flett)
 "Wasteland Of Souls" (Popplewell)
 "Blossoms Falling" (Acoustic) (Popplewell/Flett)

CD2 (ISOM41SMS)
 "Shorley Wall" (Popplewell/Flett)
 "Golden Fall" (Flett)
 "Tears from a Willow" (Sound 5's Disko 77 Mix) (Popplewell)

7" Vinyl (ISOM41S)
 "Shorley Wall" (Popplewell/Flett)
 "Buster" (Popplewell)

References

2000 singles
Ooberman songs
1999 songs
Independiente (record label) singles
Song recordings produced by Stephen Street